Lady Hae was a Galsabuyeo royal family member as the granddaughter of its founder and sister of its last ruler. It was said that she had a beautiful looks and therefore was favoured by King Muhyul, then honoured as Secondary Consort Hae (차비 해씨, 次妃 解氏) and bore him a son, Prince Hodong who was his favourite son. In 68 AD, her brother, King Dodu's kingdom was surrendered King Taejo while he united Galsabuyeo with Goguryeo.

In popular culture
Portrayed Choi Jung-won in the 2008–2009 KBS TV series The Kingdom of the Winds.

References

《Samguk Sagi》 Vol. 14·Goguryeo Book 2

Year of birth unknown
Year of death unknown
Goguryeo people
1st-century Korean people
1st-century BC Korean people
Buyeo people
Korean royal consorts